Faisal Darraj (born 1942) is a Palestinian literary and cultural critic.

Life
He was born in Al-Ja'una, a village in the Galilee in Palestine, but moved to Damascus, Syria with his family as part of the Palestinian exodus after the village was destroyed in 1948. He went to university in Syria, obtaining a BA in philosophy. In the early 1970s, he moved to France to pursue his doctorate in philosophy at Toulouse University. His dissertation was entitled "Alienation and Religious Alienation in Karl Marx’s Philosophy." Between 1975 and 1979, Darraj lived in Beirut, working at the Palestinian Research Center. In 1982, following the Israeli invasion of Beirut, he left Beirut and moved back to Damascus and then to Amman where he still currently resides.

Literary career
Darraj is recognized as a leading literary and cultural critic in the Arab world, and has a number of important works to his name. These include Bo's Al-Thaqafa fi al-Mu'asasah al-Falestiniyeh (The Misery of Culture in Palestinian Establishment) and Nathariyat al-Riwaya wa'l-Riwaya al-Arabiyya (The Theory of the Novel and the Arabic Novel). The latter has won multiple awards.

Darraj has collaborated on major literary projects with Ihsan Abbas, Saadallah Wannous, Abdelrahman Munif, and Jamal Barut. He has supervised Arabic translations of Pierre Bourdieu and Claude Lévi-Strauss. He also writes regularly for newspapers such as al-Hayat and al-Safir and literary journals like Al Jadid and Banipal.

Darraj served on the prize committee for the 1998-99 edition of the prestigious Al Owais Prize. In 2010–11, he himself became a recipient of the Al Owais Prize for his contributions to Arabic criticism and literary studies.

Selected works
 Marxism and Religion (1977)
 Reality and Utopia: A Contribution in Literary Politics (1989)
 The Misery of Culture in the Palestinian Institution (1996)
 The Future of Arabic Criticism (1998)
 The Theory of the Novel and the Arabic Novel (1999)
 Memory of the Defeated: Defeat and Zionism in the Palestinian Literary Discourse (2002)
 The Novel and the Hermeneutics of History (2004)
 Retreating Modernity: Taha Hussein and Adonis (2005)

References

Palestinian literary critics
Palestinian scholars
Palestinian writers
1942 births
Living people
University of Toulouse alumni